Tommy Zoom is a children's animated superhero television series that was shown regularly on CBeebies in the UK. It was first aired on 19 March 2007.

Developed by Alternative View Studios.

Synopsis
Each episode begins and ends with a live action sequence, narrated by Daniel (Tommy's dog), in which Tommy is faced with a dilemma. Daniel will pose the question "What should Tommy do? What would Tommy Zoom do?" The show then switches to animation to show Tommy Zoom foiling a plot by Polluto which has some link to whatever problem the real Tommy currently faces. After saving the world "in a zoom", the live-action element is re-introduced, and Tommy is seen to make the right choices and solve whatever problem he has.

Series 1 (2007–2008)
 Water Water 
 Graffiti 
 Supergranulator 
 Shower
 Caged 
 Bring Me Sunshine 
 Stop the Rot 
 Food Fight 
 Steel Thunder 
 No Sleep 
 Monsta Mega Mucky Trucky 
 Paper 
 Mark of Polluto 
 Imagination 
 Doggytron 
 Boyz Noise 
 Winning and Losing 
 Clean Up 
 Electricity 
 Capngrab 
 Framed
 Washing Hands
 Finders Keepers
 Gridlock
 Helping Others
 Losing Things
 Space Junk
 Confidence 
 Cover Up
 Aromathon

Cast

 Elliot Belshaw as Tommy Zoom
 Jerome Flynn as Daniel/Narrator
 Keith Wickham as Polluto
 Nick Mercer as Smogg
 Charlotte Murphy as Girl on Bike
 Joanne Criss as Mum
 Richard Moody as Dad
 Nathaniel Gleed as Real Life Tommy
 Molson as Real Life Daniel
 Noah Liddell and Sam Liddell as Baby Sam

Characters
 Tommy Zoom (voiced by Elliot Belshaw) is a young superhero, complete with a cape and a large Z imprinted on his chest.
 Daniel Zoom (voiced by Jerome Flynn) is Tommy's dog and sidekick, who often discovers the problem.
 Polluto (voiced by Keith Wickham) is a light blue imp or alien with rotten teeth. He is a villain who aims to ruin the world by removing all greenery and polluting watercourses with chemicals. He wears a smart purple suit.
 Smogg (voiced by Nick Mercer) is a lazy black cat who is Polluto's sidekick. Smogg's whiskers are bent and he has a huge, cheeky smile.

Other characters
These all appear in the live-action segments.
 Real Life Tommy (played by Nathaniel Gleed) causes problems around the house before he transforms into Tommy Zoom, and never speaks.
 Real Life Daniel (played by Molson) is the narrator of the story.
 Mum (played by Joanne Criss) is sometimes seen walking around the house, and never speaks.
 Dad (played by Richard Moody) is sometimes seen walking around the house, and never speaks.
 Baby Sam (played by Noah Liddell and Sam Liddell) is sometimes seen eating at the table. He sometimes laughs, but he never speaks.
 Girl on Bike (played by Charlotte Murphy) – In one episode she was riding her bike beside Tommy, but she never speaks.

References

External links
Tommy Zoom page on the CBeebies website (archived)
BBC Press Office Tommy Zoom Press Release

BBC children's television shows
2000s British animated television series
2000s British children's television series
2000s preschool education television series
2005 British television series debuts
2008 British television series endings
Animated preschool education television series
Animated television series about children
British children's animated superhero television series
British preschool education television series
British television series with live action and animation
Television series by BBC Studios
CBeebies
English-language television shows